Tony Douglas may refer to:

 Tony Douglas (footballer) (born 1952), football forward from Trinidad & Tobago
 Tony Douglas (singer) (1929–2013), American country music singer
 Tony Douglas (businessman) (born 1963), British businessman
 Tony Douglas, co-owner of Essential Media Communications, an Australian PR and polling company

See also
 Anthony Douglas (born 1985), British short track speed skater